Ravi Kumar is a Pakistani politician who was elected member for the Provincial Assembly of Khyber Pakhtunkhwa.

Political career
He was elected to Provincial Assembly of Khyber Pakhtunkhwa on a reserved seat for minorities in 2018 Pakistani general election representing Pakistan Tehreek-e-Insaf

References

Living people
Pakistan Tehreek-e-Insaf MPAs (Khyber Pakhtunkhwa)
Politicians from Khyber Pakhtunkhwa
Year of birth missing (living people)